Sathyamangalam (also known as  Sathy) is a town and municipality in Erode district in the Indian state of Tamil Nadu. 8 th century Town. It lies on the banks of the River Bhavani, a tributary of the River Cauvery in the foothills of the Western Ghats. It is about 65 km from Erode, 58 km from Tiruppur and 70 km from Coimbatore. As of 2011, the town had a population of 37,816.

Geography
Sathyamangalam is situated on the southern side of the Western Ghats, which extend towards the east from the Nilgiri mountains. The town lies close to the border of the adjoining state of Karnataka. The general topography of this town is not flat and the town is generally covered by sloping lands. The river Bhavani flows at the center of the town from west to east. Agricultural wet lands are predominant on both sides of the river and dry lands are predominant on the northern side of the town.

Flora and Fauna
A portion of the Sathyamangalam forests was declared as a wildlife sanctuary in 2008 and as a tiger reserve in 2013. Sathyamangalam was declared as reserve forest under the [[Wild Life (Protection) Act, 1972|Wildlife Protection Act, 1972]. It is contiguous with the Biligirirangan Temple Wildlife Sanctuary to the north in neighboring Chamarajanagar district of Karnataka, and together forms a vital corridor for elephant movements. The 2009 wildlife survey enumerated 10 Bengal tigers, 866 Indian elephants, 672 gaurs, and 27 leopards. The survey party observed four additional species of horned antelope including 2,348 spotted deer, 1,068 blackbuck, 304 sambar deer, 77 barking deer and four-horned antelope, 843 wild boar, 43 sloth bear and 15 striped hyenas. Herds of the famous feral buffaloes can also be spotted in places near the Moyar river.

Demographics

According to 2011 census, Sathyamangalam had a population of 37,816 with a sex-ratio of 1,006 females for every 1,000 males, much above the national average of 929. A total of 3,382 were under the age of six, constituting 1,737 males and 1,645 females. Scheduled Castes and Scheduled Tribes accounted for 10.38% and 0.74% of the population respectively. The average literacy of the town was 72.02%, compared to the national average of 72.99%. The town had a total of 11,148 households. There were a total of 17,451 workers, comprising 1,094 cultivators, 1,882 main agricultural labourers, 741 in house hold industries, 11,272 other workers, 2,462 marginal workers, 26 marginal cultivators, 430 marginal agricultural labourers, 136 marginal workers in household industries and 1,870 other marginal workers. As per the religious census of 2011, Sathyamangalam had 86.3% Hindus, 10.2% Muslims, 3.4% Christians and 0.1% others.

Government and politics

Civic Administration
Sathyamangalam is the headquarters for Sathyamangalam taluka in Erode District. The town was upgraded to a third grade municipality from the status of town panchayat in 1970 and subsequently as a second grade Municipality in 1977. It was elevated to a first grade municipality in 1998.

Politics
Sathyamanagalam assembly constituency was merged with Bhavani Sagar as a part of delimitation by the Election Commission of India. It was a part of the Gobichettipalayam parliamentary constituency until 2010 before being merged with Nilgiris.

Economy

Sathyamangalam is a town with an agricultural linter land on all sides. Sathyamangalam municipality's area in 29.24 km, comprising four revenue villages. Only 11.46% of the municipal area is developed as urban area and the remaining 89.54% remains undeveloped agricultural land.

Landmarks
Venugopalaswami temple is located about 1 km from Sathyamangalam bus stand and can be reached after crossing the Bhavani Sagar river bridge.

Transport

The town is situated at a distance of 65 km from district headquarters Erode, connected through State Highway 15 via Gobichettipalayam. The Coimbatore-Bangalore National Highway (NH 209) passes through this town. It is well connected by buses from nearby towns and cities with frequent buses available to/from Coimbatore, Erode, Tiruppur, Gobichettipalayam and Mysore. The nearest railway station is at Tiruppur (57 km). The Erode-Chamrajnagar railway line scheme was proposed in 1915 via Gobichettipalayam, Sathyamangalam. The British conducted surveys in 1922, 1936 and 1942 and survey stones were also laid for the proposed railway line. But after Independence the scheme did not take off and was rejected later amid concerns about destruction of forests and wildlife. The nearest airport is Coimbatore International Airport, which is 65 km by road, which has regular flights to New Delhi, Kolkata, Mumbai, Ahmedabad, Bangalore, Kozhikode, Chennai, Hyderabad, Pune, Sharjah and Singapore.

See also
Kaliyur
Satyamangalam block

References

Bhavani River
Cities and towns in Erode district